In mathematics, the -th harmonic number is the sum of the reciprocals of the first  natural numbers:

Harmonic numbers are related to the harmonic mean in that the -th harmonic number is also  times the reciprocal of the harmonic mean of the first  positive integers.

Harmonic numbers have been studied since antiquity and are important in various branches of number theory. They are sometimes loosely termed harmonic series, are closely related to the Riemann zeta function, and appear in the expressions of various special functions.

The harmonic numbers roughly approximate the natural logarithm function and thus the associated harmonic series grows without limit, albeit slowly. In 1737, Leonhard Euler used the divergence of the harmonic series to provide a new proof of the infinity of prime numbers. His work was extended into the complex plane by Bernhard Riemann in 1859, leading directly to the celebrated Riemann hypothesis about the distribution of prime numbers.

When the value of a large quantity of items has a Zipf's law distribution, the total value of the  most-valuable items is proportional to the -th harmonic number. This leads to a variety of surprising conclusions regarding the long tail and the theory of network value.

The Bertrand-Chebyshev theorem implies that, except for the case , the harmonic numbers are never integers.

Identities involving harmonic numbers
By definition, the harmonic numbers satisfy the recurrence relation

The harmonic numbers are connected to the Stirling numbers of the first kind by the relation

The functions

satisfy the property

In particular

is an integral of the logarithmic function.

The harmonic numbers satisfy the series identities

and

These two results are closely analogous to the corresponding integral results

and

Identities involving 

There are several infinite summations involving harmonic numbers and powers of :

Calculation
An integral representation given by Euler is

The equality above is straightforward by the simple algebraic identity

The reason is that the sum is approximated by the integral

The values of the sequence  decrease monotonically towards the limit

where  is the Euler–Mascheroni constant. The corresponding asymptotic expansion is

where  are the Bernoulli numbers.

Generating functions
A generating function for the harmonic numbers is

where ln(z) is the natural logarithm. An exponential generating function is

where Ein(z) is the entire exponential integral. The exponential integral may also be expressed as

where Γ(0, z) is the incomplete gamma function.

Arithmetic properties 
The harmonic numbers have several interesting arithmetic properties. It is well-known that  is an integer if and only if , a result often attributed to Taeisinger. More precisely,

Furthermore, Eisenstein proved that for all odd prime number  it holds

where  is a Fermat quotient, with the consequence that  divides the numerator of  if and only if  is a Wieferich prime.

for all prime numbers  and they defined harmonic primes to be the primes  such that  has exactly 3 elements.

Eswarathasan and Levine also conjectured that  is a finite set for all primes  and that there are infinitely many harmonic primes. Boyd verified that  is finite for all prime numbers up to  except 83, 127, and 397; and he gave a heuristic suggesting that the density of the harmonic primes in the set of all primes should be . Sanna showed that  has zero asymptotic density, while Bing-Ling Wu and Yong-Gao Chen proved that the number of elements of  not exceeding  is at most , for all .

Applications
The harmonic numbers appear in several calculation formulas, such as the digamma function

This relation is also frequently used to define the extension of the harmonic numbers to non-integer n. The harmonic numbers are also frequently used to define  using the limit introduced earlier:

although

converges more quickly.

In 2002, Jeffrey Lagarias proved that the Riemann hypothesis is equivalent to the statement that

The eigenvalues of the nonlocal problem

Generalizations

Generalized harmonic numbers
The nth generalized harmonic number of order m is given by

The special case m = 0 gives   The special case m = 1 reduces to the usual harmonic number:

The smallest natural number k such that kn does not divide the denominator of generalized harmonic number H(k, n) nor the denominator of alternating generalized harmonic number H′(k, n) is, for n=1, 2, ... :
77, 20, 94556602, 42, 444, 20, 104, 42, 76, 20, 77, 110, 3504, 20, 903, 42, 1107, 20, 104, 42, 77, 20, 2948, 110, 136, 20, 76, 42, 903, 20, 77, 42, 268, 20, 7004, 110, 1752, 20, 19203, 42, 77, 20, 104, 42, 76, 20, 370, 110, 1107, 20, ... 

The related sum  occurs in the study of Bernoulli numbers; the harmonic numbers also appear in the study of Stirling numbers.

Some integrals of generalized harmonic numbers are

and
 where A is Apéry's constant ζ(3),
and

Every generalized harmonic number of order m can be written as a function of harmonic numbers of order  using
   for example: 

A generating function for the generalized harmonic numbers is

A fractional argument for generalized harmonic numbers can be introduced as follows:

For every  integer, and  integer or not, we have from polygamma functions:

where  is the Riemann zeta function. The relevant recurrence relation is

Some special values are
 where G is Catalan's constant,

In the special case that , we get

where  is the Hurwitz zeta function. This relationship is used to calculate harmonic numbers numerically.

Multiplication formulas
The multiplication theorem applies to harmonic numbers. Using polygamma functions, we obtain

or, more generally,

For generalized harmonic numbers, we have

where  is the Riemann zeta function.

Hyperharmonic numbers

The next generalization was discussed by J. H. Conway and R. K. Guy in their 1995 book The Book of Numbers. Let

Then the nth hyperharmonic number of order r (r>0) is defined recursively as

In particular,  is the ordinary harmonic number .

Harmonic numbers for real and complex values

The formulae given above,

are an integral and a series representation for a function that interpolates the harmonic numbers and, via analytic continuation, extends the definition to the complex plane other than the negative integers x. The interpolating function is in fact closely related to the digamma function

The integration process may be repeated to obtain

The Taylor series for the harmonic numbers is

which comes from the Taylor series for the digamma function ( is the Riemann zeta function).

Approximation using the Taylor series expansion

The harmonic number can be approximated using the first few terms of the Taylor series expansion:

where  is the Euler–Mascheroni constant.

Alternative, asymptotic formulation 
When seeking to approximate  for a complex number , it is effective to first compute  for some large integer .  Use that as an approximation for the value of . Then use the recursion relation  backwards  times, to unwind it to an approximation for .  Furthermore, this approximation is exact in the limit as  goes to infinity.

Specifically, for a fixed integer , it is the case that

If  is not an integer then it is not possible to say whether this equation is true because we have not yet (in this section) defined harmonic numbers for non-integers.  However, we do get a unique extension of the harmonic numbers to the non-integers by insisting that this equation continue to hold when the arbitrary integer  is replaced by an arbitrary complex number .

Swapping the order of the two sides of this equation and then subtracting them from  gives

This infinite series converges for all complex numbers  except the negative integers, which fail because trying to use the recursion relation  backwards through the value  involves a division by zero.  By this construction, the function that defines the harmonic number for complex values is the unique function that simultaneously satisfies (1) , (2)  for all complex numbers  except the non-positive integers, and (3)  for all complex values .

Note that this last formula can be used to show that

where  is the Euler–Mascheroni constant or, more generally, for every  we have:

Special values for fractional arguments
There are the following special analytic values for fractional arguments between 0 and 1, given by the integral

More values may be generated from the recurrence relation

or from the reflection relation

For example:

For positive integers p and q with p < q, we have:

Relation to the Riemann zeta function
Some derivatives of fractional harmonic numbers are given by

And using Maclaurin series, we have for x < 1 that

For fractional arguments between 0 and 1 and for a > 1,

See also
 Watterson estimator
 Tajima's D
 Coupon collector's problem
 Jeep problem
 100 prisoners problem
 Riemann zeta function
 List of sums of reciprocals
 False discovery rate#Benjamini–Yekutieli procedure

Notes

References
 
 
 Ed Sandifer, How Euler Did It — Estimating the Basel problem  (2003)

External links
 

Number theory